Park Min-shik (born 20 November 1965) is a South Korean politician who currently serves as Minister of Patriots and Veterans Affairs in the Cabinet of Yoon Suk-yeol.

References 

1965 births
Living people
People from Busan
Seoul National University alumni
South Korean prosecutors
21st-century South Korean lawyers
21st-century South Korean politicians
People Power Party (South Korea) politicians
Government ministers of South Korea